The newspapers of Yorkshire have a long history, stretching back to the 18th century. Regional newspapers have enjoyed varying fortunes, reflected in the large number of now-defunct papers from Yorkshire.

Existing newspapers

Daily newspapers

Bradford Telegraph & Argus
Huddersfield Daily Examiner
Halifax Courier
Hull Daily Mail
Sheffield Star (Sheffield and South Yorkshire)
The Press (York) (York and North Yorkshire)
Yorkshire Evening Post (Leeds and West Yorkshire)
Yorkshire Post

Weekly newspapers

Barnsley Chronicle
Bridlington Free Press
Craven Herald & Pioneer
Doncaster Free Press
Easingwold Advertiser
Harrogate Advertiser
Keighley News
Knaresborough Post
Nidderdale Herald
Pocklington Post
Ripon Gazette'Rotherham AdvertiserScarborough NewsSheffield Telegraph'
Wetherby News
Wharfedale & Airedale Observer
Whitby Gazette

Monthly newspapers
The City Talking
The Yorkshire Reporter

Online-only newspapers
The Yorkshire Times

Defunct newspapers

 Harrogate Herald (1847–1957), pub. Robert Ackrill.
 Hull Portfolio, radical newspaper of James Acland, founded c.1831.
 The Hull Packet and East Riding Times / The Hull Packet Humber Mercury or Yorkshire and Lincolnshire Advertiser / Yorkshire Advertiser
 Leeds Intelligencer
 Leeds Mercury
 Thirsk and District News
 York and District Advertiser
 York Chronicle and General Advertiser
 York Chronicle
 York Citizen
 York Comet
 York Co-operative Citizen
 York Courant
 York Daily Labour News
 York Express
 York Free Press Farmers Friend and Freemans Journal
 York Gazetteer
 York Gazette (20,000th issue on 15 May 1915)
 York Herald (newspaper)
 York Journal
 York Journal or Weekly Advertiser
 York Miscellany, contributed to by John Baines (mathematician)
 York Mercury
 York News
 York Pioneer
 York Sentinel
 York Star
 York Times
 York Weekly Mail
 Yorkshire Chronicle
 Yorkshire Express
 Yorkshire Gazette (1740-1752)
 Yorkshire Independent
 Yorkshire Observer
 Yorkshireman

See also
List of newspapers in the United Kingdom
History of British newspapers

References

External links
 Newsplan - for further information on Yorkshire newspapers